Avialeasing Aviation Company is a cargo airline based in Tashkent, Uzbekistan. It operates cargo services linking cities in Asia with western and eastern Europe. Its main base is Yuzhny Airport, Tashkent. It is a joint US-Uzbek venture and formed SRX Group in Florida in 1993.

History 

The airline was established and started operations in 1992. It was the first private airline in Uzbekistan and is owned by SRX Transcontinental (61%) and Igor Smirnov (39%).

Services 

Avialeasing operates freight services to the following international scheduled destinations (at January 2005):

Afghanistan
Kabul (Kabul International Airport)
Kazakhstan
Almaty (Almaty International Airport)
Kyrgyzstan
Bishkek (Manas International Airport)
Uzbekistan
Tashkent (Yuzhny Airport)

Fleet 

The Avialeasing fleet includes the following aircraft (at May 2012):

 Antonov An-26B
 Ilyushin Il-76MD

The airline has also leased out two Antonov An-12B aircraft to SRX Group in Florida.

See also 

List of airlines of Uzbekistan
Transport in Uzbekistan

External links
Avialeasing

References

Airlines of Uzbekistan
Cargo airlines
Airlines established in 1992
1992 establishments in Uzbekistan